Set Aside Your Tears (Till the Boys Come Marching Home) is a World War I song written and composed by Wolfe Gilbert, Malvin Franklin, and Anatole Friedland. The song was first published in 1917 by Jos. W. Stern & Co. in New York, NY. The sheet music cover depicts a woman waving to marching troops.

The sheet music can be found at the Pritzker Military Museum & Library.

References 

Bibliography
Parker, Bernard S. World War I Sheet Music 1. Jefferson: McFarland & Company, Inc., 2007. . 
Vogel, Frederick G. World War I Songs: A History and Dictionary of Popular American Patriotic Tunes, with Over 300 Complete Lyrics. Jefferson: McFarland & Company, Inc., 1995. . 

1917 songs
Songs of World War I
Songs written by L. Wolfe Gilbert
Songs written by Anatole Friedland